Twickenham United Reformed Church, formerly Twickenham Congregational Church, on Twickenham Green at First Cross Road, Twickenham in the London Borough of Richmond upon Thames, is a United Reformed Church congregation. Its Minister is Stephen Lewis.

The church's founder was Lady Amelia Shaw, second wife of Sir Robert Shaw, whose schoolroom (the site of the current church hall) was registered for public worship in 1835. The first chapel was built in 1844 and the premises were significantly rebuilt and enlarged in 1866.

Services are held on Sundays at 10.30am and 6pm.

References

History of the London Borough of Richmond upon Thames
Churches in Twickenham
United Reformed churches in the London Borough of Richmond upon Thames